Istiblennius bellus, the imspringer, is a species of combtooth blenny found in coral reefs in the Pacific and western Indian ocean. It is also known as the beautiful rockskipper or the dusky blenny.  Males of this species can reach a maximum of  SL, while females reach a maximum of  SL.

References

bellus
Fish described in 1861
Taxa named by Albert Günther